Paulette Rakestraw (born May 7, 1967) is an American politician who served in the Georgia House of Representatives from the 19th district from 2011 to 2019. First elected in 2011, she served until losing a primary election run-off for the Republican nomination.

Rakestraw earned her bachelor's degrees in communications and PR from Kennesaw State University.

References

1967 births
Living people
Republican Party members of the Georgia House of Representatives